The 2012 German Football League season was the thirty fourth edition of the top-level American football competition in Germany and thirteenth since the renaming of the American football Bundesliga to German Football league.

League tables

GFL
The league tables of the two GFL divisions:

Key

Play-offs

References

External links
 Official GFL website 
 GFL 2012  

Gfl
Gfl
German Football League seasons